The 1996 Calgary Stampeders finished in 1st place in the West Division with a 13–5 record. They appeared in the West Final but lost to the Edmonton Eskimos.

Offseason

CFL Draft

Preseason

Regular season

Season standings

Season schedule

Awards and records
Jackie Parker Trophy – Kelvin Anderson (RB)

1996 CFL All-Stars

Offence 
 OG – Rocco Romano
 OT – Fred Childress

Defence 
 CB – Al Jordan
 CB – Marvin Coleman

Special teams 
 K – Mark McLoughlin

Western All-Star selections

Offence 
 QB – Jeff Garcia
 SB – Allen Pitts
 WR – Terry Vaughn
 OG – Rocco Romano
 OT – Fred Childress

Defence 
 DT – Rodney Harding, Calgary Stampeders
 CB – Al Jordan, Calgary Stampeders
 CB – Marvin Coleman, Calgary Stampeders

Special teams 
 P – Tony Martino, Calgary Stampeders
 K – Mark McLoughlin, Calgary Stampeders
 ST –Marvin Coleman, Calgary Stampeders

Playoffs

West Final

References

Calgary Stampeders seasons
Calg